Bernard Moullier (born 27 September 1957) is a French former ski jumper. Moullier competed at the 1980 Winter Olympics.

References

External links
http://data.fis-ski.com/dynamic/athlete-biography.html?sector=JP&listid=&competitorid=41832

1957 births
Living people
French male ski jumpers
Olympic ski jumpers of France
Ski jumpers at the 1980 Winter Olympics
Place of birth missing (living people)
20th-century French people